Lars Porsena (or Porsenna;) was an Etruscan king (lar) known for his war against the city of Rome. He ruled over the city of Clusium (modern Chiusi). There are no established dates for his rule, but Roman sources often place the war at around 508 BC.

War against Rome

Lars Porsena came into conflict with Rome after the revolution that overthrew the monarchy there in 509 BC, resulting in the exile of the semi-legendary last king of Rome, Lucius Tarquinius Superbus. The deposed monarch, whose family was of Etruscan origin, tried and failed to retake the throne a number of times before appealing to Porsena for assistance, since at that time Clusium was said to be a very powerful Etruscan city.

At this point, however, the histories diverge. According to most mainstream Roman accounts, including Livy, Porsena attacked and besieged Rome, but was sufficiently impressed by particular acts of Roman bravery in defending the city that he chose to make peace. Other accounts, however, suggest that Porsena was at least partially successful in subduing the city. None of the accounts, however, suggests that Tarquinius Superbus was returned to the throne. Thus, if Lars Porsena did indeed capture Rome, he may have done so with the intent of controlling it himself, not restoring the former dynasty.

Accounts of the war include a number of matters directly concerning Porsena.  One story tells that, during his siege of Rome, a Roman youth named Gaius Mucius sneaked into the Etruscan camp with the approval of the Senate, intent on assassinating Porsena. However, when Mucius came into the king's presence, he could not distinguish Porsena from his secretary, who was similarly attired. Mucius stabbed the secretary and then tried to flee. He was immediately captured by the Etruscans and brought before Porsena, whereupon Mucius bluntly declared his identity and his intent. He advised Porsena that he was merely the first of 300 Roman youths who would attempt such a deed, one after another until they succeeded. To prove his valour, Mucius thrust his right hand into a sacrificial fire, thereby earning for himself and his descendants the cognomen Scaevola ("lefty").  Astonished and impressed by the young man's courage, Porsena gave Mucius his freedom and dismissed him from the camp.  According to Livy, Porsena sought peace by treaty immediately afterward.

Another tale of the war concerns the Roman hostages taken by Porsena as part of the treaty.  One of the hostages, a young woman named Cloelia, fled the Etruscan camp, leading away a group of Roman virgins.  Porsena demanded that she be returned, and the Romans consented.  On her return, however, Porsena was so impressed by her bravery that he asked her to choose half the remaining hostages to be freed.  She selected all the youngest Roman boys. Afterwards the Romans gave Cloelia the unusual honour of a statue at the top of the Via Sacra, showing Cloelia mounted on a horse—that is, as an eques.

Livy also recounts that during his own time, public auctions of goods at Rome were by tradition referred to as "selling the goods of king Porsena", and that this somehow relates to the war with Clusium.  Livy concludes most likely it is because, when Porsena departed Rome, he left behind as a gift for the Romans his stores of provisions.

In 507 BC, Porsena once again sent ambassadors to the Roman senate, requesting the restoration of Tarquinius to the throne.  Legates were sent back to Porsena, to advise him that the Romans would never re-admit Tarquinius, and that Porsena should out of respect for the Romans cease requesting Tarquinius' readmittance.  Porsena agreed, telling Tarquinius to continue his exile elsewhere than Clusium.  Porsena also restored to the Romans their hostages, and also the lands of Veii that had been taken from Rome by treaty.  Livy records that, by these matters, a faithful peace between Porsena and Rome was created.

War with Aricia

In 508 BC, after the siege of Rome, Porsena split his forces and sent part of the Clusian army with his son Aruns to besiege the Latin city of Aricia. The Aricians in turn sent for assistance from the Latin League and from Cumae, and the Clusian army was defeated in battle.

Tomb

According to most accounts, Lars Porsena was buried in an elaborate tomb in (or under) the city he ruled. Pliny the Elder describes Porsena's tomb as having a 50 Roman foot high rectangular base with sides 300 feet long (approx. 15 x 89 m). It was adorned by pyramids and massive bells.

Porsena's tomb would have been razed to the ground together with the rest of the city of Clusium in 89 BC by the Roman general Cornelius Sulla.

Fictional treatment

The story of Lars Porsenna and the Roman hostage Cloelia is the basis of the libretto  (1762) by Pietro Metastasio. The French writer Madeleine de Scudéry wrote  in 1661.

Lays of Ancient Rome (1842) by Thomas Babington Macaulay  tells the legendary story of the Roman Horatius defending the bridge into Rome against Lars Porsena's oncoming Etruscan army.

Robert Graves' I, Claudius (1934) features a fictional conversation between the emperor-to-be Claudius and the historians Livy and Pollio about the accuracy of Livy's histories, specifically bringing up the questions of whether Lars Porsena took Rome, and whether the story about Scaevola is true.

References

Sources

6th-century BC rulers
Etruscan kings
History of Tuscany
Military personnel of antiquity
People from Chiusi